Gulf Developmental Road is an Australian highway linking the Cairns and Normanton regions in northern Queensland, Australia. It is the only sealed (asphalt) road linking these two regions.

In the east, the road begins at an unnamed junction on the southern edge of Forty Mile Scrub National Park, 241 km south-west of Cairns. The Gulf Developmental Road runs west before terminating at its junction with the Burke Developmental Road 7 km south of Normanton, a total distance of 442 km. Towns along the route include Mount Surprise, Georgetown and Croydon. There are no other communities along the route, but it passes through the ghost town of Cumberland. The road is sealed for its full length, but as of 2018 there are many sections of the road which are only single lane bitumen. These sections require caution when passing other traffic as the shoulders are gravel and vehicles need to move partly onto the shoulders. They extend between points about 55 kilometres west of Georgetown and 20 kilometres west of Mount Surprise.

The Gulf Developmental Road is designated Highway 1; however, it is not part of the National Highway network.

Major intersections

Upgrades
The Roads of Strategic Importance initiative, last updated in March 2022, includes the following projects for the Gulf Developmental Road.

Corridor upgrade
A lead project to upgrade the Cairns to Northern Territory border corridor, including the Gulf Developmental Road and surrounding state and council roads, at an estimated cost of $62.5 million, was commenced in 2020, with planning continuing.

Pavement strengthening and widening
A project for pavement strengthening and widening of sections of the Gulf Developmental Road between  Mount Garnett and Croyden at a cost of $21.5 million is planned to be completed by mid-2022. This project is targeted for "early works" by the Queensland Government, and is split into two packages.

See also

 Einasleigh River Bridge
 Highways in Australia
 List of highways in Queensland

References

Highways in Queensland
Highway 1 (Australia)